National question is a term used for a variety of issues related to nationalism.  It is seen especially often in socialist thought and doctrine.

In socialism
 Social Democracy and the National Question by Vladimir Medem in 1904
 Social Democracy and the Nationalities Question by Otto Bauer in 1907
 The Nationalities Question by Rosa Luxemburg in 1909
 Theses on the National Question, writings by Vladimir Lenin in 1913, first published in 1925
 The Problem of Nationalities, Chapter 39 of Leon Trotsky's History of the Russia Revolution Volume 3: The Triumph of the Soviets
 Marxism and the National Question, a 1913 pamphlet by Joseph Stalin on the definition and roles of nations within Marxism
 Zur nationalen Frage in Österreich, a 1937 articles by Alfred Klahr on Austria
 On the Question of Nationalities in Ethiopia by Wallelign Mekonnen in 1969

Other national questions 
 Adriatic question
 Armenian question
 Aromanian question
 Bessarabian question
 Croatian question
 Eastern question
 Greek Plan
 Thracian question
 German question
 Schleswig–Holstein question
 Irish question
 Jewish question
 Kaliningrad question
 Karelian question
 Kurdish question
 Mosul question
 Macedonian question
 Polish question
 Quebec national question
 Roman question
 Schleswig-Holstein question
 Serbian question
 Ukraininan question, see Little Russia and Russification of Ukraine
 Wendish question
 West Lothian question
 "Question of Western Sahara", the title of two United Nations resolutions:
 United Nations General Assembly Resolution 34/37
 United Nations General Assembly Resolution 40/50

See also 
 National liberation (Marxism)
 Occasional Discourse on the Negro Question
 Self-determination
 The Race Question
 Wars of national liberation

References

Further reading
 Case, Holly. The Age of Questions (Princeton University Press, 2018)  excerpt

External links 

 Lenin on the National Question Archive at marxists.org